525 North Tryon (also known as Odell Plaza) is a  office highrise located in the city of Charlotte, North Carolina. It is the 25th tallest building in Charlotte, and the 33rd tallest in North Carolina. The building also includes a 607-car below-grade parking garage.

Located at North Tryon Street and Ninth Street, 525 North Tryon counts Bank of America and the Centralina Council of Governments as tenants. On December 3, 2012, Parkway Properties Inc. of Orlando, Florida announced its $47.4 million purchase of the building from First States Investors 5000A LLC.

See also
List of tallest buildings in Charlotte
List of tallest buildings in North Carolina

References

  525 North Tryon on Emporis
  525 North Tryon Official Site

Skyscraper office buildings in Charlotte, North Carolina
Office buildings completed in 1999
1999 establishments in North Carolina